The Prize Fighter Inferno is an acoustic/electronica solo project of Claudio Sanchez, the lead singer and lead/rhythm guitarist for the band Coheed and Cambria. The first album, called My Brother's Blood Machine was released on October 31, 2006 through indie label Equal Vision Records. According to My Brother's Blood Machine liner notes, Claudio recorded the album over a period of seven years with "...random recording devices...".

Music 

Before the album's release, four official songs were available for listening online:
 The Fight Of Moses Early & Sir Arthur McCloud (released on November 10, 2005 on Myspace)
 The Margretville Town Dance (later changed to The Margretville Dance) (released on November 10, 2005 on Myspace)
 The Missing McCloud Boys (originally called I'm Going To Kill You) (released on November 10, 2005 on Myspace)
 Who Watches The Watchmen? (released on October 9, 2006 on Myspace)

These songs are available on the band's official MySpace page.  The first single in the album is "Who Watches The Watchmen?"
A 30-second clip of the song "78" was available on various websites advertising the release of the CD.

I'm Going To Kill You was released on an Equal Vision Records "Inventing The Scene" compilation in 2003.

In April 2020, Sanchez announced new music from the Prize Fighter Inferno on the project’s Facebook page. The first new single, “More Than Love”, was released on April 3. Later that month, On the 23rd, a cover of the Ben E. King song, “Stand by Me” was released to streaming services and digital retailers as well.

In an article from Spin Magazine on May 12, 2020, Sanchez stated, “I figured, if there’s any time to do this, it’s now. I’ll get a bunch of songs together, put a record out, I will feel good, and then get back to Coheed”. In the same article, two new songs were debuted from the project, “Death Rattle” and “Crazy for You”.

Other songs 
In 2004, a leaked recording of several In Keeping Secrets of Silent Earth: 3 acoustic demos made its way to several P2P networks. Among these were a few Prize Fighter Inferno demos, including "Blood Machine," "Run Like Hell," and "Your Love" (a cover of The Outfield).

On May 25, 2008, a song titled "From China With Love" was posted on the official MySpace along with a short blog entry explaining that Claudio Sanchez now wasn't sure that leaving it off My Brother's Blood Machine was the best idea, and that it was being released online to tide fans over until the next album, which the reader is assured is in the works. On September 25, 2009, A new song called "Gears" was introduced in the trailer of Claudio's comic series Kill Audio. The song was released on 7" vinyl along with another song called "Erizo Schultz" in February 2010. The vinyl credits both Claudio Sanchez and his wife Chondra Echert as "The Prize Fighter Inferno".  An EP was released for New York Comic Con 2012 titled "Half Measures" with tracks, Elm Street Lover Boy, Simple Fix, Pistol Pete Matty, and Half Measures.  On Record Store Day, the EP is set to release as a Glow in the Dark vinyl, along with The Afterman: Descension Big Beige Demos in a coke-bottle clear vinyl, and Davenport Cabinet's EP in a blue vinyl.

When the fourth issue of Kill Audio was released, people who had ordered via MerchNow received a vinyl EP titled "Beaver Records." This EP included the previously-unreleased songs "Gears" and "Erizo Schultz."

Live performance 
On December 5, 2008, Claudio performed a solo acoustic show during Coheed and Cambria's Neverender shows in London, UK. The performance of In Keeping Secrets of Silent Earth: 3 was cancelled on December 2 due to a power cut, and was moved to December 5, with Claudio as the support to make up for the delay. Claudio played three cover songs, two Prize Fighter Inferno songs, and a new song he had written a few days before. Claudio gave information on the new song, titled "The Echomaker," saying that it was a demo for a project he and his wife were working on, a musical called "Rosie Barbara and the Family Massacre." The title of the song came from the book of the same name that Claudio's wife was reading at the time, which he felt fit with the subject of the story. The setlist of that night was as follows:

1. "Your Love" (The Outfield cover)
2. "Purple Haze" (Jimi Hendrix cover)
3. "Wayne Andrews, the old bee Keeper" (PFI song)
4. "The Echomaker" (new song)
5. "Who Watches the Watchmen?" (PFI song)
6. "Faithfully" (Journey cover)

On their 2011 Neverender: SSTB tour, Coheed and Cambria played "Who Watches The Watchmen?" as part of their acoustic set.

Discography

My Brother's Blood Machine (2006)
Beaver Records EP (2011)
Half Measures EP (2012)
Stray Bullets EP (2020)
The City Introvert (2021)

Music videos

Plot

Like the albums of Coheed and Cambria, this album is a concept album that tells a story. It contains many of the same recurring themes as the Coheed and Cambria story, such as love, the importance of children, and death. The album is being told from the point of view of a character known as "The Prise Fighter Inferno" a.k.a. Jesse from the Coheed and Cambria concept. He is also featured in The Amory Wars, Sanchez's comic books about the Coheed and Cambria story.

The name of the album, My Brother's Blood Machine, is a phrase that appears in Coheed and Cambria's In Keeping Secrets of Silent Earth: 3. This story is set in the past of the universe from the Amory Wars. In an interview with rock-sound.net in 2005, Claudio Sanchez has said that the two stories "do connect, but not in the most obvious way."

Long-arm and Butchie Bleam brothers brought together by physical distortion and social seclusion are about to find themselves in the running for the most unusual job in the world.....DEATH! Listen to the story unfold as we follow these two misunderstood yet maniacal minstrels of macabre in a neverending race for ultimate power. Listen to the disturbing details as the songs takes you through the hell that is the Blood Machine. This is a story being told in song......this is hell being unleashed through love and sound...... I am the hitchhiker doomed to tell the tale of Margretville, I am your Guide, I am the Prise Fighter Inferno.

In an interview posted by MTV News on September 29, 2006, Claudio went into much greater detail about the plot:

"Well, this story actually acts as a prequel to the Amory Wars," the center of the Coheed and Cambria mythology, Sanchez explains. The Inferno character, who appears in the Coheed concept as a man named Jesse, "dies in the Good Apollo: Volume One, and is resurrected on present-day Earth. So he leaves the solar system that the story takes place in, and gets resurrected in the present day. But before he can tell the story of the Amory Wars, he needs to tell the story of the Blood Machine.

"The Blood Machine revolves around three families, one being the Bleam family, who are our horrific sort of 'Texas Chainsaw Massacre' family," he continued. "There's the McCloud family — where we have our main character, Cecilia — and the Early family. And [Cecilia's] love interest is the son of that family, Johnny. And there are so many subplots. One, for example, talks about how Cecilia's father happens to molest her, and eventually she can't take it anymore and tries to convince Johnny to leave with her. She steals her two brothers, who happen to be twins, and Johnny decides not to go. So she ends up running away with the twins into the woods, where she meets the Bleam family."

Sanchez said that there are two Bleam brothers — Long-Arm and Butchie — who are horrific monsters. "Their mother happens to be crazy, and she ends up telling these two kids that 'God has come to me with a higher calling for you — you need to be the new Death,' and she tells them that they have to go out and collect souls for God," he explained. "And so, out of their mind, they're like, 'OK, so when a body dies, how do we get the soul out of it?' They construct this Blood Machine, which basically tears a body to shreds, and they think that releases the soul."

Sanchez said there are numerous subplots that will unfold as well, including the elaborate background of the Bleam kith: The family's patriarch, a meth addict, dismembers his wife when he catches her pinching from his stash, and her death sends the Bleam boys on a downward spiral toward complete madness.

References

External links
 Official MySpace page
 Equal Vision Records

Electronic music groups from New York (state)
Equal Vision Records artists